Kincaldrum is a hamlet in the county of Angus, Scotland. It lies 1 km northwest of Gateside. Kincaldrum House lies in ruins. A corn mill once stood near the hamlet.

References

Villages in Angus, Scotland